Doris Meltzer (born 21 June 1973) is an Austrian handball player. She competed in the women's tournament at the 2000 Summer Olympics.

References

1973 births
Living people
Austrian female handball players
Olympic handball players of Austria
Handball players at the 2000 Summer Olympics
Handball players from Vienna